Major-General Hardy Nelson Ganong CBE, VD, ED (Apr 18, 1890 - February 24, 1963) was a Canadian sportsman and a military commander who served in both World War I and II.

Early life
The son of Edward Morrison Ganong and Margaret A. Lunn, Hardy Ganong was born and educated in St. Stephen, New Brunswick. He was a cousin to the family that founded Ganong Bros. chocolate makers and after completing his schooling went to work in this business.

World War I
In 1909, Hardy Ganong joined the Canadian Militia, then following the outbreak of World War I enlisted in the Canadian Expeditionary Force. He was sent overseas as part of the Canadian Expeditionary Force where he served on the battlefields of France as a member of the 5th Battalion Canadian Mounted Rifles. He was wounded in February 1917, suffering a gunshot wound to the left shoulder during a routine period with his unit in the trenches. He was discharged from hospital and was subsequently returned to duty in November 1917. Demobilized in 1919, he returned home where, in 1920, he married schoolteacher Mildred Viola Thomas of Calais, Maine with whom he had three children.

World War II
During peacetime, Ganong remained as a member of the militia, and, by the time World War II broke out, he had risen to the rank of lieutenant colonel. Made commander of the Carleton and York Regiment, he led the regiment as the first Canadian military unit to ship to England for battle duty. In March 1941, Ganong took command of the 3rd Canadian Infantry Brigade and in July 1942 was promoted to major general. Sent back to Canada on the advice of Bernard Montgomery, he was appointed general officer to organize and command the 8th Canadian Infantry Division of the Home Service Divisions. Stationed for a time at Prince George, British Columbia, in October 1943 he was placed in command of the 6th Canadian Infantry Division headquartered on Vancouver Island, where he was in charge of preparations for participation in the invasion of Japan.

Ganong was awarded the Efficiency Decoration for his years of voluntary military service and in 1944 was appointed a Commander of the Order of the British Empire. In December 1944, with Canadian participation in the invasion of Japan cancelled and a Pacific coastal defence no longer deemed necessary, he was assigned to command the Allied troops in Newfoundland, where he remained until his retirement in 1945. His son, Russell Edward Ganong, also served during the war with his father's old Carleton and York Regiment. He was killed during the Italian Campaign on March 18, 1944. He was survived by his wife, Mary Mackenzie, and an infant son, Hardy MacKenzie Ganong, born September 29, 1943.

Later life
Out of the army, Ganong served as honorary aide-de-camp to Governor Generals the Earl of Athlone, Vincent Massey and Georges Vanier. From 1955 to 1962 he was the full-time civil defence co-coordinator with responsibility for the organizing and training of all civil defence forces for the Province of New Brunswick.

Politics
A St. Stephen town councilor for two years, Ganong was the Progressive Conservative Party of Canada candidate in the 1949 Canadian federal election for the riding of New Brunswick Southwest. Of the 12,336 ballots cast, he lost by 58 votes to the Liberal incumbent, A. Wesley Stuart. He ran unsuccessfully against Stuart a second time in 1953.

Sporting and business interests
Ganong was also an active member of the executive committee of the New Brunswick Boy Scouts Association and served as the provincial movement's president. Among his other activities, he was vice-president of the N.B. Division, Canadian Red Cross, president, N.B. Boy Scouts Association, director, Charlotte County Board of Trade, Board member, Connors Bros. Ltd., and president of the New Brunswick Fish and Game Protective Association.

An avid curler, Ganong was president of the St. Stephen Curling Club for thirty-five years and president of the New Brunswick branch of the Royal Canadian Caledonia Curling Club. He was also voted president of the New Brunswick Curling Association for 1935–1936 term, and made its honorary president from 1941 to 1945. As a player, Ganong was 2nd stone on the St. Stephen team that won the 1930 Ganong Cup, a trophy donated by cousin Arthur Ganong given annually to the winner of the provincial curling championship. His team's win earned them the right to compete for the national title in the 1930 Macdonald Brier.

As much as he was enthusiastic about the sport of curling, Ganong was equally as passionate about harness racing. St. Stephen had a racetrack and he wrote a column on the sport for the local Saint Croix Courier weekly newspaper. He was also a racing judge at meets throughout New Brunswick and Maine and for two seasons was a judge at Exhibition Park Raceway in Saint John, New Brunswick.

Death
Ganong and his wife died in February 1963 as a result of an auto accident during a winter snow storm on Route 1 in Charlotte County, New Brunswick while returning home from the city of Saint John. They are buried at the St. Stephen Rural Cemetery.

References

Sources
New Brunswick Sports Hall of Fame - 1930 curling champions
 Saint Croix Courier obituary for Hardy Ganong, February, 1963
 Telegraph-Journal obituary for Hardy Ganong, February 25, 1963
 Folster, David. The Chocolate Ganongs of St. Stephen, New Brunswick (1991) Goose Lane Editions 
 Craigs, Melodie. Ganong, The Candy Family (1984) Literacy Council of Fredericton 
 
Generals of World War II

1890 births
1963 deaths
Canadian generals
Road incident deaths in Canada
Canadian military personnel from New Brunswick
Canadian Expeditionary Force officers
New Brunswick candidates for Member of Parliament
Curlers from New Brunswick
Canadian male curlers
People from St. Stephen, New Brunswick
Hardy
Accidental deaths in New Brunswick
Canadian Commanders of the Order of the British Empire
Canadian Army generals of World War II
Canadian Militia officers
Carleton and York Regiment